François Schaller (1928–2006) was a Swiss economist.

1928 births
2006 deaths
Swiss economists
Academic staff of the University of Lausanne